Chloroclystis mniochroa is a moth in the  family Geometridae. It is found in Australia (Queensland).

The wingspan is about 20 mm. Adults have brown patterned wings.

References

Moths described in 1904
Chloroclystis
Moths of Australia